Hyperlais cruzae is a species of moth in the family Crambidae described by Ramón Agenjo Cecilia in 1953. It is found in Spain and southern France.

References

Moths described in 1953
Cybalomiinae